Alexander P. and James S. Waugh House is a historic home located at Greenville, Mercer County, Pennsylvania.  It was built in 1826, and is a two-story, five bay, "L"-shaped brick residence with a stepped gable in the Federal style.  It sits on a cut sandstone foundation.  The front facade has a three bay wide entrance porch with a hipped roof, and a tripartite center window on the second floor.

It was added to the National Register of Historic Places in 1998.

References

Houses on the National Register of Historic Places in Pennsylvania
Federal architecture in Pennsylvania
Houses completed in 1826
Houses in Mercer County, Pennsylvania
1826 establishments in Pennsylvania
National Register of Historic Places in Mercer County, Pennsylvania